Clive Carter is a British actor and singer, best known for his role of "Claude Elliott and others" in the original London cast of Come From Away, for which he received an Olivier Award nomination. He studied at London Academy of Music and Dramatic Art. 

His West End theatre credits include Someone Like You with Petula Clark, A Man for All Seasons with Martin Shaw, Cat on a Hot Tin Roof with Brendan Fraser and Ned Beatty, We Will Rock You, I Love You, You're Perfect, Now Change, Bamatabois/Grantaire and later Javert in Les Misérables, Raoul in The Phantom of the Opera, A Midsummer Night's Dream, The Taming of the Shrew, Always at the Victoria Palace with Shani Wallis and Side by Side by Sondheim. He was nominated for a Laurence Olivier Award for his performance as The Wolf/Cinderella's Prince in Into the Woods.

Other UK stage credits include a national tour of Oklahoma!; Putting It Together at the Old Fire Station Theatre in Oxford; Macbeth, As You Like It, Henry V, and 'Tis Pity She's a Whore at Northcott, Exeter; A Little Night Music and Mrs. Warren's Profession at the Nottingham Playhouse; and Godspell at the Leicester Haymarket. He starred as Frank-N-Furter in a European tour of The Rocky Horror Show.

On UK television Carter has appeared in Rep, EastEnders, and Dalziel and Pascoe. He had a small role in the feature film The Da Vinci Code.

He played the role of The Wonderful Wizard of Oz in the West End production of the musical Wicked. He replaced Sam Kelly from Monday 29 March 2010, starring opposite Rachel Tucker and Louise Dearman. He was highly acclaimed in the role, and exited the show alongside Dearman and many other of his co-stars on Saturday 10 December 2011, after almost two years in the role. Desmond Barrit returned to the company, replacing Carter.

In October 2011, he appeared in a concert of the new musical Soho Cinders at the Queen's Theatre, London. He originated the roles of Mr. Salt in Charlie and the Chocolate Factory at the Theatre Royal, Drury Lane and Harold Zidler in Moulin Rogue at the Piccadilly Theatre. His performance in the latter earned him another nomination for the Laurence Olivier Award for Best Actor in a Supporting Role in a Musical.

Filmography

Film

Television

References

External links
 

Alumni of the London Academy of Music and Dramatic Art
British male stage actors
British male musical theatre actors
British male television actors
British male film actors
British male singers
Living people
Year of birth missing (living people)
Place of birth missing (living people)